Libythea cinyras was a species of butterfly in the nymphalid subfamily Libytheinae. It is now thought to be extinct. It was endemic to Mauritius. The only known specimen is the holotype.

References

External links
 Libythea cinyras holotype

Butterflies described in 1866
Libythea
Extinct butterflies
Endemic fauna of Mauritius
Extinct insects since 1500
Extinct animals of Mauritius
Taxonomy articles created by Polbot
Taxa named by Roland Trimen
Species known from a single specimen